Ian Rowling (born 10 February 1967) is an Australian sprint canoeist who competed in the early 1990s. At the 1992 Summer Olympics in Barcelona, he won a bronze medal in the K-4 1000 m event.

Rowling also won a silver medal in the K-4 10000 m event at the 1991 ICF Canoe Sprint World Championships in Paris.

References

Sports-reference.com profile

1967 births
Australian male canoeists
Canoeists at the 1992 Summer Olympics
Living people
Olympic canoeists of Australia
Olympic bronze medalists for Australia
Olympic medalists in canoeing
ICF Canoe Sprint World Championships medalists in kayak
Medalists at the 1992 Summer Olympics
20th-century Australian people